HMAS Flinders (FFG) is the second ship of the Hunter-class frigate of the Royal Australian Navy.

Development and design 

The Hunter-class frigate is a future class of frigates for the Royal Australian Navy (RAN) to replace the Anzac-class. Construction is expected to begin in 2020, with the first of nine vessels to enter service in the late 2020s. The Program is expected to cost AU$35 billion and a request for tender was released in March 2017 to three contenders: Navantia, Fincantieri, and BAE Systems as part of a competitive evaluation process.

The Hunter-class frigate will be an Australian variation of the Type 26 class frigate that is to be operated by the Royal Navy from the mid-2020s.

Construction and career 
Flinders was ordered on 30 June 2018 and named after Captain Matthew Flinders. She will be built by BAE Systems Australia in Osborne.

References 

Frigates
Hunter-class frigates